Enyalioides oshaughnessyi, the red-eyed woodlizard or O'Shaughnessy's dwarf iguana, is a species of lizards in the family Hoplocercidae. It occurs in southern Colombia and northern Ecuador. The specific name oshaughnessyi honors Arthur O'Shaughnessy, a British herpetologist.

References
 

Enyalioides
Lizards of South America
Reptiles of Colombia
Reptiles of Ecuador
Reptiles described in 1881
Taxa named by George Albert Boulenger